is a former Nippon Professional Baseball pitcher, and current the second squad pitching corch for the Fukuoka SoftBank Hawks of Nippon Professional Baseball (NPB).

He previously played for the Fukuoka Daiei Hawks / Fukuoka SoftBank Hawks.

Professional career

Active player era
Tanoue joined the Fukuoka Daiei Hawks in the off-season of 1989 without going through the Nippon Professional Baseball draft.

From 1990 to 1995, he played in the Western League of NPB second league. He made his debut in the Pacific League during the 1996 season, pitched in two games.

He helped his team win the Pacific League Championship with eight wins during the 2000 season and started Game 4 of the 2000 Japan Series.

In the 2001 season, Tanoue went 13-7 as a starting pitcher with a .650 winning percentage, honored for the Pacific League Winning percentage Leader Award and the Best Battery Award with Kenji Johjima.

On October 29, 2007, he decided to retire. 

In his 18-season career, Tanoue pitched in 153 games, posting a 39-42 win–loss record, and a 4.21 ERA.

After retirement
After his retirement, Tanoue was appointed assistant conditioning coach for the Fukuoka Softbank Hawks in the 2008 season and became the first squad pitching coach in the 2009 season.

He was also the second squad pitching coach for the 2011-2012 season.

He served as second squad pitching coach for the Hokkaido Nippon-Ham Fighters during the 2013-2014 season.

Tanoue returned to the Fukuoka Softbank Hawks as the second squad pitching coach for the 2015 season and the first squad pitching coach for the 2016 season and the third squad pitching coach for the 2017 season.

He is also the second squad pitching coach beginning with the 2020 season.

References

External links

 Career statistics - NPB.jp 
 82 Keisaburo Tanoe PLAYERS2022 - Fukuoka SoftBank Hawks Official site

1971 births
Fukuoka Daiei Hawks players
Fukuoka SoftBank Hawks players
Japanese baseball coaches
Japanese expatriate baseball players in the United States
Living people
Nippon Professional Baseball coaches
Nippon Professional Baseball pitchers
Salinas Spurs players
Baseball people from Kagoshima Prefecture